Asperdaphne albovirgulata is a species of sea snail, a marine gastropod mollusk in the family Raphitomidae.

Description
The length of the shell attains 14 mm, its diamerter 6.5 mm.

Distribution
This marine species occurs off New Caledonia.

References

 Stahlschmidt P., Poppe G.T. & Tagaro S.P. (2018). Descriptions of remarkable new turrid species from the Philippines. Visaya. 5(1): 5-64

External links
 Souverbie S.M. (1860). Descriptions d'espèces nouvelles des l'Archipel Calédonien. Journal de Conchyliologie. 8: 123-126, pl. 2.

albovirgulata
Gastropods described in 1860